Pangrapta plumbilineata is a species of moth in the family Erebidae. The species is found in Taiwan.

The wingspan is 24–28 mm.

References

Moths described in 1929
Pangraptinae